BioCubaFarma is a Cuban state-run biotechnology organization. It is responsible for roughly 50% of all Cuban research activities. It was created by government decree in 2012, from a variety of already existing organizations.

References

External links 
 

2012 establishments in Cuba
COVID-19 vaccine producers
Medical and health organizations based in Cuba
Biotechnology companies of Cuba